Thamnoldenlandia is a genus of plants in the Rubiaceae. It contains only one known species, Thamnoldenlandia ambovombensis, endemic to Madagascar.

References

Monotypic Rubiaceae genera
Spermacoceae